Qosja may refer to:
Isa Qosja, Albanian film director
Rexhep Qosja, Albanian writer